Train Jam is an annual game jam that takes place aboard the Amtrak California Zephyr train, which travels from Chicago, Illinois, to Emeryville, California, on the days immediately preceding the Game Developers Conference in San Francisco.

There is not consistent Internet access aboard the train during the trip, which encourages a sense of community and teamwork amongst the participants. Past participants include prominent members of the indie game development community, such as Rami Ismail and Sean Vanaman. In addition to attracting professional and independent developers, train jam has a "student ambassador" program and has included students throughout every jam.

Train Jam was founded in 2014 by Adriel Wallick, and occurred every year up to 2019 at which point it was put on hold due to the COVID-19 pandemic.  Readers can play past games made at train jam for free on various websites.

References

External links
 

Game jams
Recurring events established in 2014
2014 establishments in the United States